Donald Allen (13 December 1926 – 7 July 2008) was an Australian cricketer. He played five first-class cricket matches for Victoria between 1950 and 1952.

See also
 List of Victoria first-class cricketers

References

External links
 

1926 births
2008 deaths
Australian cricketers
Victoria cricketers
Cricketers from Melbourne